Here Be Daemons: Tales of Horror and the Uneasy is a short story anthology by author Basil Copper.  It was published by Robert Hale Publishing in 1978.  It was Copper's third book published and was reissued in paperback by Sphere Books, 1981.

Stories
 Old Mrs Cartwright
 The Knocker at the Portico
 The Way the World Died
 The Second Passenger
 The Treasure of Our Lady
 Justice at the Crossroads
 Mrs Van Donk
 The Trodes
 The Great Vore

References

1980 American novels
American gothic novels
American mystery novels
Robert Hale books